Stodoły may refer to the following places in Poland:
Stodoły, Kuyavian-Pomeranian Voivodeship (north-central Poland)
Stodoły, Świętokrzyskie Voivodeship (south-central Poland)
Stodoły, Rybnik in Silesian Voivodeship (south Poland)